Neoregelia ampullacea is a species of flowering plant in the genus Neoregelia. This species is endemic to Brazil.

References

BSI Cultivar Registry Retrieved 11 October 2009

ampullacea
Flora of Brazil